RjDj (Reality Jockey Ltd.) was a startup founded in late 2008 by last.fm co-founder Michael Breidenbruecker. The company was based in London and was run by a small team of four employees.
Its mission was to create sonic experiences specifically designed for the latest generation of personal music players. RjDj produced and distributed a network of mobile applications and sold additional musical content within this network.

RjDj developed a new genre of music that it called reactive music, a non-linear form of music that was able to react to the listener and their environment in real-time. Reactive music is closely connected to generative music, interactive music, and augmented reality. Similar to music in video games, that is changed by specific events happening in the game, reactive music is affected by events occurring in the real life of the listener. Reactive music adapts to a listener and their environment by using built in sensors (e.g. camera, microphone, accelerometer, touch-screen and GPS) in mobile media players. The main difference to generative music is that listeners are part of the creative process, co-creating the music with the composer. Reactive music is also able to augment and manipulate the listeners real-world auditory environment.

What is distributed in reactive music is not the music itself, but software that generates the music. Applications made by RjDj were available on Apple’s iOS platform. The technology behind it was based on the Pure Data (or Pd) digital signal processing framework. Reactive music pieces, so called Scenes, could be made using rjlib, which is an open source library of useful software building blocks to construct reactive music.

RjDj closed its website and removed its apps from circulation in 2013.

Apps Developed
 RjDj
 RjDj Shake
 Love by Air
 Inception – The App
 Kids on DSP – reactive minimal techno
 Little Boots – Reactive Remixer
 Dimensions – The Game
 Rj Voyager
 MusicZones
 Trippy 
 Dark Night Rises Z+
 The app formerly known as H _  _ r

Artists who have released music as RjDj apps
 ookoi
 Carl Craig
 Little Boots
 Air
 Acid Pauli
 Booka Shade
 Jimmy Edgar
 Chiddy Bang
 Son of Dave
 Kirsty Hawkshaw
 Venus Hum
 Easy Star Allstars
 Sophie Barker
 Kids on DSP
 Hans Zimmer
 Netsky

YouTube videos
  – Dimensions – from the makers of Inception The App
  – Hans Zimmer about Inception The App
  – Inception The App – Sleep Dream Review
  – RjDj Rj Voyager featuring Booka Shade
  – Little Boots Reactive Remixer iPhone app tutorial

References

Defunct companies based in London
Computer music software
IOS software
British companies established in 2008
Software companies established in 2008
2008 establishments in England
British companies disestablished in 2013
Software companies disestablished in 2013
2013 disestablishments in England